Volac: Book of Angels Volume 8 is an album by Erik Friedlander performing compositions from John Zorn's second Masada book, "The Book of Angels".

Track listing
All compositions by John Zorn
 "Harhazial" - 4:36
 "Rachsiel" - 2:39 
 "Zumiel" - 1:40
 "Yeruel" - 3:24
 "Sannul" - 1:19
 "Haseha" - 4:36
 "Kadal" - 3:53
 "Ahaniel" - 5:45
 "Ylrng" - 1:37
 "Anahel" - 4:18
 "Sidriel" - 3:03
 "Zawar" - 4:38

Personnel
Erik Friedlander – cello

References 

2007 albums
Albums produced by John Zorn
Book of Angels albums
Tzadik Records albums
Erik Friedlander albums